Park Row may refer to:

 Park Row (Manhattan), a street in downtown Manhattan, New York
 Park Row (BMT station), demolished elevated train terminal in Manhattan
 Park Row, Leeds, a street in the centre of the financial and entertainment districts of Leeds city centre, West Yorkshire
 Park Row (film), a 1952 film by Samuel Fuller

See also
 Park Row Building, 1899 Manhattan skyscraper